This is a list of airports in Togo, sorted by location.

Togo, officially the Togolese Republic, is a country in West Africa bordered by Ghana to the west, Benin to the east, Burkina Faso to the north, and the Gulf of Guinea to the south. The capital city is Lomé. The country is divided into five regions.

Airports
Airport names shown in bold indicate the airport has scheduled service on commercial airlines.

See also
 List of airports by ICAO code: D#DX - Togo
 Transport in Togo

References 
 
  - includes IATA codes
 Great Circle Mapper: Airports in Togo - IATA and ICAO codes
 World Aero Data: Airports in Togo - ICAO codes

 
Togo
Airports
Airports
Togo